Sætre (also called Vartdal) is a village along the shore of the Vartdalsfjorden in the municipality of Ørsta, in Møre og Romsdal county, Norway. It is located in the Årset valley in the Vartdal district of Ørsta.

This village was the administrative centre of the former municipality of Vartdal from 1895–1964.

References

Ørsta
Villages in Møre og Romsdal